Rick & Renner is a Brazilian musical duo of sertanejo music formed by the singers and composers Geraldo Antônio de Carvalho, aka Rick (Monte do Carmo, December 5, 1966) and Ivair dos Reis Gonçalves, aka Renner (Patos de Minas, November 19, 1971) in 1986.

In 25 years as a duo they performed for an audience estimated at 225 million people, with an average of 15,000 people per show. Rick & Renner moved more than 300 million reais with their shows, consecrating themselves as one of the biggest duos in the history of sertanejo music.

History 
Rick, who got a taste for music through his father, had a hard time finding a partner in the beginning of his career, having his sister as his first duo under the name Sereno & Serenata. However, after a certain time, Rick's father forbade his daughter to follow a career with his brother because they had to sing in some dangerous places. He went from partner to partner until the day he went to Brasília for a show and needed to call a nightclub to borrow some equipment and, while waiting on the line, he heard Renner singing in the background and wanted to meet him. Within the individualities of each one of the duo, a unique essence was elaborated. On one side, Rick, who grew up listening to popular songs sung by his father in the fairs of Tocantins and on the radio stations of Goiás. On the other side, Renner, who enjoyed the chords and lyrics of Legião Urbana, Capital Inicial and Os Paralamas do Sucesso.

They started working as Rick & Renner in 1986, performing in some nightclubs until they recorded their first independent CD in 1991 (with Renner as the lead singer). One of their shows was attended by Zezé Di Camargo & Luciano, who take them to the Continental East West recording company, which today belongs to the multinational Warner Music Brasil, where the duo's first official album was recorded in 1992, getting a good reception.

But success really came in 1998, when they released the song "Ela é Demais", which stayed for five consecutive months in the charts, and is considered until today one of the biggest classics of the duo and of the sertanejo music. All of the duo's CDs (except the second) were produced by Manoel Nenzinho Pinto, who, besides being a producer, was also the duo's manager. After many years of career, 18 CDs and 3 DVDs recorded, the duo has sold more than 10 million records, with an average of 150 concerts per year. Over time, they have recorded great hits such as "Ela é Demais", "Cara de Pau", "Muleca", "Fim de Semana", "Seguir em Frente", "O Amor e Eu", "Filha", "Só Pensando Em Você", "Eu Sem Você", "Nos Bares da Cidade", "Eu Mereço", "Bebedeira", "Nóis Tropica, Mas Não Cai", among others.

The separation 
In early 2010 rumors that the duo might split up started to spread. This happened for many reasons, from the release of a parallel work of Rick Sollo with his son Victor Henrique, to Renner's candidacy for the Senate in Goiás. The separation culminated in Renner's absences in events to promote the work ironically titled Happy End, which had the illustrious participation of Frejat in the song that gives the album its name. The official announcement of the separation was made on January 1, 2011, at the duo's last show, which took place in Gaspar, Santa Catarina. After the release of the 21st album of their career and 22 years of partnership, one of the most beloved duos of sertanejo music has split up. A few days after the announcement, Rick adopted the artistic name Rick Sollo, signed with Talismã Music and released three new songs on the internet. Renner also continued in sertanejo, under the stage name Renner Reis, contradicting the information that he had become a gospel singer.

The return of the duo 
After almost twoo years apart, Rick & Renner resumed the formation on September 24, 2012, announcing that they would be performing together again. In the same year, they released the CD Inacreditável o Poder do Amor by Radar Records, produced by Rick. The recording of the duo's third DVD took place on February 20, 2013, in the Via Marquês concert hall, in São Paulo and included special appearances by Eduardo Costa, Rionegro & Solimões, Léo Maia and Pablo.

New separation 
On January 5, 2015, Rick announced again, via Instagram, the end of the duo. It is likely that the new car accident involving Renner, who was intoxicated, was the reason. Rick stated that: "I lost count of how many times I sat down with him to give advice and fix mistakes...". After the separation, Rick returned to a solo career and released the album Foi Deus, with special appearances by Gusttavo Lima, Daniel, Rionegro & Solimões, Chitãozinho & Xororó, Bonni & Belucco, Marciano and Father Fábio de Melo. In 2017, he formed a duo with singer Giovani, from the defunct duo Gian & Giovani, called Rick & Giovani, with the project Dois Corações, which lasted until the end of 2018. Renner also formed another duo, called Renner & Rennan, after abandoning his gospel career.

New return of the duo 
In June 2018 rumors surfaced that the duo Rick & Renner might return. However, neither Rick, Renner, nor the management had a statement about this story, which left fans in doubt. This suspense continued until August 12, 2018, when Rick and Renner officially announced the duo's return on Domingão do Faustão, promoting the Seguir em Frente Tour, which should last two years and is touring several cities in Brazil. The tour also has international shows, including countries in Europe, United States, Canada, Japan, among others. "We've reconsidered coming back thanks to the affection we've received from our fans, supporting us in this journey. For sure it will be a project that will have a lot of love involved and of course, serious commitment", Rick explained. The project resulted in a CD with 17 re-recorded tracks with an acoustic version, with Rick & Renner's greatest hits and a new song: "Como Assim", written by Rick. Among the classics are "Ela É Demais", "Nos Bares da Cidade", "Filha", "Só Pensando em Você", and others. "This approach has done well for us, because there are no hard feelings. We are united and together. I can't wait to feel the affection of the public again. And hit the road with my partner", Renner completed. In a first moment, Rick & Renner's return would be a 2-year project, called Seguir em Frente (English: Moving Forward). This project is managed by Vibe Promoções Artísticas.

Accident 
The accident happened around 9 a.m. on August 20, 2001, on state highway Luís de Queirós (SP-304), which connects Americana to Piracicaba, at km 144. Ivair dos Reis Gonçalves, the singer Renner, was on his way to Piracicaba to promote the duo's work in countryside radio stations and would meet Rick Sollo, who was already in the city. According to the Federal Highway Police, the car driven by Renner, a BMW 328i, overtook a motorcycle coming in the opposite direction. The two occupants of the motorcycle, Eveline Soares Rossi, 31, and Luís Antonio Nunes Acetto, 35, died on the spot. Renner and his secretary were admitted to the Municipal Hospital of Santa Bárbara d'Oeste. Renner broke some teeth and suffered minor fractures.

Conviction 
Renner Reis was found guilty of the accident, being convicted of manslaughter (unintentional), but the penalty of 2 years and 8 months in prison was converted to 2,000 minimum wages (R$1,874,000.00 at today's value) to the family of the victims and community service. The decision, available on the website of the Superior Court of Justice, on Friday (April 30, 2010), puts an end to the legal battle waged since 2002 between the family of Luis Antonio Nunes Acetto and the singer Renner Reis. The decision confirms the first instance sentence that condemned Renner to pay compensation for material and hedonic damages at very relevant levels. Renner was sentenced to pay 2 thousand minimum wages plus 1% interest per month. The outcome of the case, besides being a response to the victim's family, is legally an innovation of the Judiciary regarding the level of compensation for violent death by carelessness in traffic. Given the violence of the accident, the public exposure of the family's grief and suffering, and Renner's conduct after the accident, the compensation was fixed at an amount four times higher than the value established by the current common law of the Courts. After the expert examination, it was found that, at the moment of impact, the car driven by Renner was traveling at a speed of almost 100 miles per hour. Although he has already been summoned to pay, Renner has not yet expressed the possibility of spontaneously complying with the decision.

Renner in politics 
In 2010 Renner ran for senator for Goiás for the Progressive Party (PP), a position for which he was invited to run by the former governor of the state, Alcides Rodrigues (PP). He was part of the Goiás on the Right Track coalition, led by then candidate for governor Vanderlan Cardoso (PR). A few weeks before the elections, Renner gave up his candidacy for personal reasons. Even though he dropped out, Renner received 76,410 votes.

Discography

Studio albums 

 1991 – Atitudes
 1992 – Rick & Renner
 1994 – Rick & Renner Vol. 2
 1995 – Rick & Renner Volume III
 1997 – Rick & Renner Vol. 4
 1998 – Mil Vezes Cantarei
 1999 – Instante Mágico
 2000 – Seguir em Frente
 2001 – É Dez, É Cem, É Mil
 2002 – Só Pensando Em Você
 2003 – 10 Anos de Sucesso - Acústico
 2004 – Só Nós Dois
 2006 – Bom de Dança
 2007 – Coisa de Deus
 2008 – Passe o Tempo que Passar
 2010 – Happy End
 2012 – Inacreditável o Poder do Amor
 2018 – Seguir em Frente

Collections 

 1998 – Grandes Sucessos
 2000 – Bailão do Rick & Renner
 2001 – Os Gigantes
 2001 – Warner 25 Anos
 2006 – Warner 30 Anos
 2007 – Nova Série
 2008 – Essencial
 2009 – Tudo de Bom (Double Disc)
 2010 – Nossa História – BOX 3 CDs

Live Albums and DVDs 

 2003 – 10 Anos de Sucesso - Acústico
 2005 – Rick & Renner e Você...
 2013 – Bom de Dança - Vol. 2

Curiosities 

 Rick was the great responsible for putting back the duo Gino & Geno in the success charts.

 Rick, besides being a singer, is also a great composer, having several compositions recorded by important names of the Brazilian music as: Chitãozinho & Xororó, Milionário & José Rico, Daniel, João Paulo & Daniel, Leandro & Leonardo, Bruno & Marrone, Zezé Di Camargo & Luciano and Gian & Giovani.

 Renner has already dated TV presenters Amanda Françozo and Helen Ganzarolli.

See also 

 List of best-selling albums in Brazil
 Sertanejo music

References

External links 

 Rick & Renner's official website

Sertanejo music groups
Sertanejo musicians
Brazilian musical duos
Musical groups established in 1986
1986 establishments in Brazil